Punta Carnero Lighthouse is an active lighthouse located on the headland known as Punta Carnero to the south of Algeciras, Spain.
The lighthouse was designed and built by Jaime Font, who also designed the lighthouse at Chipiona. Opened in 1874, it overlooks the Strait of Gibraltar.

See also

 List of lighthouses in Spain

References

External links

 Comisión de faros

Lighthouses completed in 1874
Lighthouses in Andalusia
Buildings and structures in Algeciras